Norden Systems was an American manufacturer of radar systems.

History 
The Norden Laboratories Corporation was founded in New York City in 1943 to conduct research, while the separate Carl L. Norden Corporation built Norden bombsights. In 1949, the company was purchased by Paul W. Adams. Then, in 1955 it was merged with the Ketay Instrument Corporation to form Norden-Ketay Corporation. The company was bought by United Aircraft in 1958. It remained a subsidiary through the transition to United Technologies – in the process absorbing Dynell Electronics Corporation and becoming Norden Systems – before being sold to Westinghouse Electric in 1994. However, following an employee backlash due to a planned move to Baltimore, it was sold for a final time to Northrop Grumman in 1996. Decreasing utilization of the division's headquarters would eventually force the closure of the division in 2013.

Products

Other 
 Marine Integrated Fire and Air Support System (MIFASS)

Radars 

 AN/APG-74
 AN/APG-76
 AN/APQ-92
 AN/APQ-103
 AN/APQ-112
 AN/APQ-118
 AN/APQ-148
 AN/APQ-155
 AN/APQ-156
 AN/APY-3
 AN/ASB-1
 AN/BPS-15
 AN/SPQ-9
 AN/SPS-40B
 AN/SPS-67

References

Notes

External links 
 Norden Retirees Club

1943 establishments in New York City
American companies established in 1943
Avionics companies
Defense companies of the United States
Defunct manufacturing companies based in Connecticut
Electronics companies established in 1943
Manufacturing companies established in 1943
Northrop Grumman
Radar manufacturers
Technology companies established in 1943
United Technologies